Derek Kohler (born 22 January 1953) is a South African cricketer. He played in one first-class match for Western Province in 1976/77, and one List A match for Boland in 1984/85.

References

External links
 

1953 births
Living people
South African cricketers
Boland cricketers
Western Province cricketers
Cricketers from Cape Town